Bingfen, also called ice jelly, is a Chinese dessert native to Southwest China in provinces such as Sichuan, Guizhou, and Yunnan. It is served as a bowl of iced transparent jelly, made from the seeds of the Nicandra physalodes plant, along with toppings like haw flakes and wolfberries. It is commonly sold in the summertime as a street food.

References

See also 

 Sichuan cuisine
 Aiyu jelly
 List of Chinese desserts
 Chinese desserts

Sichuan cuisine
Chinese desserts
Yunnan cuisine